Diane Lewis may refer to:
Diane Lewis (architect) (1951–2017), American architect. author and academic
Diane Lewis (journalist) (c. 1953–2007), American newspaper reporter
Diane Lewis (Guernsey legislator), British political personality

See also
Diana Lewis (1919–1997), American movie actress
Lewis (disambiguation)